Ytyk-Kyuyol (Itık Küöl) is a rural locality (a selo) and the administrative center of Tattinsky District of the Sakha Republic, Russia, located on the left bank of the Tatta River (in the Aldan's basin),  from Yakutsk, the capital of the republic. As of the 2010 Census, its population was 6,828.

Etymology
It is named for a nearby lake, whose name literally means "sacred lake" in the Yakut language.

History
Ytyk-Kyuyol became the administrative center of the newly created Alexeyevsky District in 1930. The district was given its present name (after the Tatta River) in 1990.

Ytyk-Kyuyol is often affected by flooding, most recently on May 20, 2007, when 873 houses were submerged and more than 3,000 people had to be evacuated.

Economy
An agricultural center, Ytyk-Kyuyol has developed cattle and horse breeding industries; growing of potatoes and other vegetables is also common. There is also some timber production.

Ytyk-Kyuyol is located on the R504 Kolyma Highway, allowing road access to Yakutsk.

Demographics

Ethnic Yakuts make up over 95% of the population.

Education
There are two middle-grade schools, a gymnasium, a music school, and a sports school, as well as the literary-artistic museum-reserve "Tatta".

Gallery

References

Notes

Sources
Official website of the Sakha Republic. Registry of the Administrative-Territorial Divisions of the Sakha Republic. Tattinsky District. 

Rural localities in Tattinsky District